Vikram Chandra (born 23 July 1961) is an Indian-American writer. His first novel, Red Earth and Pouring Rain, won the 1996 Commonwealth Writers' Prize for Best First Book.

Early life
Chandra was born in New Delhi in 1961. His father Navin Chandra was a business executive. His mother Kamna Chandra has written several Hindi films and plays. His sister Tanuja Chandra is a filmmaker and screenwriter who has also directed several films. His other sister Anupama Chopra is a film critic.

Chandra did his high school education at Mayo College in Ajmer, Rajasthan. He attended at St. Xavier's College in Mumbai and, as an undergraduate student, transferred to Kenyon College in the United States. Chandra felt isolated at Kenyon so he transferred to Pomona College, Claremont, California, where he graduated with a B.A. magna cum laude in English. He attended film school at Columbia University, leaving halfway through to begin work on his first novel. He received his M.A. from The Writing Seminars at Johns Hopkins University in 1987. He has taught at George Washington University, and lectured at University of California, Berkeley.

Career
Red Earth and Pouring Rain (1995), Chandra's first novel, was inspired by the autobiography of James Skinner - the Irish Raja of Hansi in Haryana, a legendary nineteenth-century Anglo-Indian soldier. It was published in 1995 by Penguin Books in India; by Faber and Faber in the UK; and by Little, Brown in the United States. It won the Commonwealth Writers Prize for Best First Book and the David Higham Prize for Fiction. The novel is named after a poem from the Kuruntokai, an anthology of Classical Tamil love poems.

Love and Longing in Bombay (1997), a collection of short stories, was published by the same houses as Red Earth and Pouring Rain. It won the Commonwealth Writers Prize for Best Book (Eurasia region) and was short-listed for the Guardian Fiction Prize. In 2000, Chandra served as co-writer, with Suketu Mehta, for Mission Kashmir, a Bollywood movie. It was directed by his brother-in-law, the director Vidhu Vinod Chopra, and starred Hrithik Roshan.

Sacred Games (2006) is Chandra's most recent novel. Set in Mumbai, it features Sartaj Singh, a policeman who first appeared in Love and Longing in Bombay. Over 900 pages long, Sacred Games was one of the year's most anticipated new novels. It had been the subject of a bidding war amongst leading publishers in India, the UK, and the US. It has also been adapted as a web television series by Netflix.

Geek Sublime: The Beauty of Code, the Code of Beauty (2014) was a finalist for the National Book Critics Circle Award (Criticism).

Personal life
Chandra is married to the writer Melanie Abrams. They both teach creative writing at the University of California, Berkeley. Chandra currently divides his time between Mumbai, and Oakland, California, United States. He has two daughters, Leela and Darshana.

Bibliography 

Love and Longing in Bombay: Stories, Penguin Books, 1997, 
; HarperCollins, 2007, 

Sacred Games Netflix Tie-in Edition Part 1. Penguin. 2018.  
Sacred Games Netflix Tie-in Edition Part 2. Penguin. 2018.

See also
List of Indian writers

References

External links
Vikram Chandra's webpage
"The Cult of Authenticity", Boston Review
A conversation with Vikram Chandra
Radio Interview on Bookworm, NPR
AN INTERVIEW WITH VIKRAM CHANDRA, Bookslut, MARCH 2007

English-language writers from India
Indian emigrants to the United States
Indian male novelists
Pomona College alumni
Columbia University School of the Arts alumni
University of California, Berkeley faculty
20th-century American novelists
21st-century American novelists
American novelists of Indian descent
American Hindus
1961 births
Living people
Mayo College alumni
Writers from the San Francisco Bay Area
George Washington University faculty
American male novelists
20th-century American male writers
21st-century American male writers